SMART-L (Signaal Multibeam Acquisition Radar for Tracking, L band) is a long-range naval search radar introduced in 2002 by Thales Nederland, formerly Hollandse Signaalapparaten (Signaal).

The digital antenna array has 24 elements; all are used for reception, while 16 are used for creating virtual receiver beams through digital beamforming. The beams' vertical elevation, and compensation for ship movement, is done electronically. Horizontal training is done by mechanically rotating the entire array.

As designed, SMART-L has a maximum range of  against patrol aircraft, and  against stealthy missiles. A software upgrade, Extended Long Range (ELR) Mode, extends the maximum range for the detection of ballistic missiles to over 2000 km, since 2018 all 4 Zeven Provincien class Frigates of the Royal Netherlands Navy have been equipped with the update.

On the 25th of September 2017, as part of the exercise Formidable Shield 2017 the SMART-L MM radar system mounted on the test tower at the Thales premises in Hengelo, detected and tracked a ballistic missile launched from the Hebrides in Scotland at an average range of more than 1500 km without difficulties. The Thales SMART-L Multi Mission radar in Hengelo detected the target as soon as it appeared over the horizon and maintained a stable track for more than 300 seconds. The track quality was sufficient to enable Launch On Remote by BMD-capable naval ships.

Variants
 SMART-L
 SMART-L MM/N (Multi-mission, Naval)
 SMART-L MM/F (Multi-mission, Fixed)
 S1850M

Specifications

Antenna system: 
Number of antenna elements: 24 (16 transceivers, 8 receivers)
Number of beams formed: 16
Beamwidth 2.2° horizontal, 0–70° vertical
Polarization: vertical
Frequency: L band
Rotational speed: 12 rpm
IFF system integrated, D band
Maximum detection ranges:
Stealth missiles: 
Patrol aircraft: 
Ballistic missiles:2000 km after software upgrade.
Maximal numbers of tracked targets:
Airborne: 1000
Seaborne: 100

Users

See also

Thales/BAE Systems Insyte S1850M, a SMART-L derivative.
 Selex RAN-40L

References

Sea radars
Thales Group
Military equipment introduced in the 2000s
Military radars of the Netherlands